The 2000 Spengler Cup was held in Davos, Switzerland from December 26 to December 31, 2000.  All matches were played at HC Davos's home arena, Eisstadion Davos. The final was won 4-2 by HC Davos over Team Canada - Davos 11th title and first title since 1958

Teams participating
 Team Canada
 HC Davos
 Kölner Haie
 HC Sparta Praha
 Jokerit

Tournament

Round-Robin results

All times local (CET/UTC +1)

Finals

External links
Spenglercup.ch

2000–01
2000–01 in Swiss ice hockey
2000–01 in Czech ice hockey
2000–01 in Canadian ice hockey
2000–01 in Finnish ice hockey
2000–01 in German ice hockey
December 2000 sports events in Europe